Xanthospila is a genus of round-necked longhorn beetles of the subfamily Cerambycinae.

Callichromatini